Seafoam salad (made with lime-flavored jello), also known as orange salad (made with orange-flavored jello), is a cafeteria and buffet staple popularized by F. W. Woolworth's lunch counters.  Seafoam salad is often considered a dessert because of its sweetness, and so is one of many dessert salads. It is composed of green lime-flavored gelatin, cream cheese, pears, maraschino cherries, and whipped topping.

Multiple versions of the recipe exist; variations include substituting crushed pineapple for the pears, or adding mayonnaise and nuts to the mixture, thereby making it less sweet.

See also
 Frogeye salad
 Fruit salad
 Jello salad
 Lime Jello Marshmallow Cottage Cheese Surprise
 List of desserts
 List of salads

References

External links
 Orange salad recipe
 Seafoam salad recipe with pineapple variation
 Seafoam salad recipes

Fruit dishes
Fruit salads
Desserts
F. W. Woolworth Company
Lunch counters
Limes (fruit)
Jello salads
Sweet salads